This is a list of the past and present mayors of Beverly, Massachusetts.

References

Beverly